Orthotylus  adenocarpi is a species of bug from the Miridae family that can be found in Andorra, Benelux, Czech Republic, Denmark, France, Germany, Great Britain, Ireland, Poland, Spain, and Sweden.
O. adenocarpilives exclusively on broom Sarothamnus scoparius.  In addition, to sucking sap they also suck aphids and Psyllidae.  The nymphs occur from mid-May, adult bugs from mid-June to a maximum of mid-August.

Subspecies
Orthotylus adenocarpi adenocarpi (Perris, 1857)
Orthotylus adenocarpi purgantis Wagner, 1957

References

Insects described in 1857
Hemiptera of Europe
adenocarpi